Andre Heimgartner (born 8 June 1995) is a New Zealand motor-racing driver who currently competes in the Repco Supercars Championship driving the No. 8 Holden Commodore ZB for Brad Jones Racing.

Career

Formula racing
At 12 years of age commenced racing in the NZ Formula Vee championship.
Heimgartner became the youngest driver in the world to win a Formula Ford Championship at the age of fifteen when he won the New Zealand Formula Ford Championship during the 2010–11 season. He returned to successfully defend his title for the 2011–12 season whilst contesting selected events in the 2011 Australian Formula Ford Championship.
2013 Selected races in Australian Formula 3.

Touring cars

New Zealand
In 2012, Heimgartner entered the inaugural season of the New Zealand-based V8SuperTourer series, driving a Holden VE Commodore run by AV8 Motorsport. He finished the sprint championship in tenth place overall, achieving a best result of fourth place at Hampton Downs Motorsport Park; and seventh place in the endurance championship, with his best finish being fifth place in the Fathers' Day 400 at Taupo Motorsport Park. He was classified eleventh overall at the end of the season.

Moving from AV8 Motorsport to the Melbourne Performance Centre and then Motorsport Networks teams during a four-season period. Heimgartner went on to become the only driver to compete in every race of the championship over the 4-year period. Achieving 15 podium finishes.

Australia

Parallel to his appearances in the V8Supertourer category in 2012, Heimgartner contested the Australia-based Porsche Carrera Cup series at the age of 16. Andre ran as high as 4th for much of the season before a no fault contact by a competitor caused a DNF.  2013 Dunlop V8 Supercar Series, driving an ex-Dick Johnson Racing Ford FG Falcon entered by Finance EZI Racing, which entered Heimgartner alongside Josh Hunter as the team's drivers. In 2014 Andre drove for Matt White in the supercar Dunlop series with 3 podium finishes.

Also in 2013 saw Andre's first drive in a V8 Supercars Holden Commodore VF. Due to his close association with Paul Morris he got to do co-driver laps in Dean Fiore's No. 88 Lucas Dumbrell Motorsport entry at Queensland Raceway replacing Matt Halliday in the dedicated co-driver session.

In 2014, Heimgartner was selected to race the Super Black Racing wildcard entry at the 2014 Supercheap Auto Bathurst 1000 alongside fellow Kiwi Ant Pedersen. Following this performance the team retained him in the teams' full-time category début the following season. 2015 was a formative year for the new Superblack team and was plagued by performance inconsistencies. A best qualifying position of 3rd and numerous top 10 finishes for the 2015 season.
Andre's second year in Supercars and severe budget constraints lead to relocation to the minnow LDM team, car performance and reliability issues produced disappointing results.

Endurance racing

In 2013, Heimgartner contested the Bathurst 12 Hour event at the Mount Panorama Circuit in Bathurst, New South Wales. Sharing a BMW 335i with co-drivers Anthony Gilbertson and Peter O'Donnell, Heimgartner finished the race first in his class.
In NZ Heimgartner as a 14-year-old won the Mini Challenge 3-hour endurance classic. As a 16-year-old driving ab RSR Porsche while leading the field by 15 laps suffered a terminal mechanical issue 10 minutes from the chequered flag. Achieved various successes in endurance competition driving GT3 Porsches for Fastway and Hood.
Competed in 2 seasons of V8 Supertourer endurance competition with Paul Morris as co-driver.

By February 2018 Andre had completed 4 consecutive Bathurst 1000 endurance events with a best placing of 9th.

Personal life
Heimgartner is currently engaged to Jewelry Designer Jemma Boskovich. He was in a relationship with Renee Gracie between 2014 and 2017.

Racing record

Career results

Supercars Championship results

Complete Bathurst 1000 results

‡Walsh was entered as a co-driver to Slade but withdrew and was replaced with Heimgartner.

References

External links 
 Official Webpage
 Driver Database profile
 Profile at Racing Reference

1995 births
Living people
New Zealand racing drivers
Sportspeople from Auckland
Formula Ford drivers
Supercars Championship drivers
V8SuperTourer drivers
Toyota Racing Series drivers
Australian Formula 3 Championship drivers
Nismo drivers
Kelly Racing drivers
Craft-Bamboo Racing drivers